Events from the year 1710 in France.

Incumbents 
Monarch: Louis XIV

Events
 
 
 
 
 
 August 20 – War of the Spanish Succession: Battle of Saragossa: The Spanish-Bourbon army commanded by the Marquis de Bay is soundly defeated by the forces of the Habsburg monarchy under Guido Starhemberg and their allies.

Births
 
 February 15 – Louis Duke of Anjou, great-grandson of reigning King Louis XIV and his eventual successor (as Louis XV) (d. 1774)
 November 13 – Charles Simon Favart, French dramatist (d. 1792)
 Date unknown
Antoine Yart, poet and translator (d. 1791)

Deaths
 

 February 16 – Esprit Fléchier, French writer and Bishop of Nîmes (b. 1632)
 February 25 – Daniel Greysolon, Sieur du Lhut, French explorer (b. c. 1639)
 March 4 – Louis III, Prince of Condé (b. 1668)
 June 7 – Louise de La Vallière, mistress of King Louis XIV of France (b. 1644)

See also

References

1710s in France